Fujifilm Finepix s9600 or Finepix s9100 is a prosumer or bridge digital camera released by Fujifilm in 2006 and intended for the enthusiastic amateur. The camera is basically an upgrade from the Finepix s9500 or s9000 due to a few technical faults such as the Command dial failure. A few upgrades have been put in place such as improved LCD size and quality, image sharpness and low light autofocus, the new camera acts as a definite upgrade to its predecessor. However. it does not have optical image stabilization, a desirable feature in long-zoom cameras. Consumers wanting that feature would have to wait until the next upgrade of this line of camera, the S100fs. 

It has a long list of advanced prosumer features, like combining having wide angle (28mm equivalent on a 35mm camera) with having a long-zoom which is rare among long-zoom cameras (most of which being 35mm equivalent at the wide end of the zoom). It also has a full range of manual settings, mechanical zoom ring, high ISO-sensitivities and some of the versatile features of Live-Preview Digital cameras (LPDs) or compact cameras like movie mode, movable LCD panel, macro mode, etc.

Main Features 
 9.0 million effective pixels (18 million when RAW-enabled)
 RAW option
 Lens: 6.2-66.7mm focal length (equivalent to 28-300mm on 35mm film)
 Max aperture f/2.8-4.9
 21.4x total zoom (10.7x optical, 2.0x digital)
 Macro mode starting from 1cm
 Sensitivity: ISO equivalent to ISO 80/100/200/400/800/1600
 Shutter speeds: 30 secs. to 1/4000 second
 Hot shoe for external flash
 Compact flash memory cards and XD
 Video recording
 Tilting 2.0-inch LCD with 235,000 pixels
 Crop factor 4.5x

External links 
 Fujifilm Finepix S9600 at Fujifilm.co.uk
 Dpreview.com
 Megapixel.net
 DigiCamReview

S9100